Baron Henrik Jan Peter van Asbeck (born December 26, 1954 in The Hague, South Holland) is a former field hockey player from The Netherlands. Van Asbeck is best known as a member of the Dutch National Team that finished sixth in the 1984 Summer Olympics in Los Angeles, California.

Family
Van Asbeck's younger brother, Ewout, was also a member of the Dutch squad that competed in the 1984 Olympic Games held in Los Angeles.

Career
Van Asbeck earned a total number of eighteen caps, scoring two goals, in the years 1983-1984. He retired from international competition after the 1984 Olympic Games.

External links
 
 Dutch Hockey Federation

1954 births
Living people
Barons of the Netherlands
Dutch male field hockey players
Olympic field hockey players of the Netherlands
Field hockey players at the 1984 Summer Olympics
Field hockey players from The Hague
Peter